The 1967 Australian Championships was a tennis tournament that took place on outdoor Grass courts at the Memorial Drive, Adelaide, Australia from 20 to 30 January. It was the 55th edition of the Australian Championships (now known as Australian Open), the 14th and last one held in Adelaide and the first Grand Slam tournament of the year. The singles titles were won by Australian Roy Emerson and American Nancy Richey.

Seniors champions

Men's singles

 Roy Emerson defeated  Arthur Ashe  6–4, 6–1, 6–4

Women's singles

 Nancy Richey defeated  Lesley Turner  6–1, 6–4

Men's doubles

 John Newcombe /  Tony Roche defeated  Bill Bowrey /  Owen Davidson 3–6, 6–3, 7–5, 6–8, 8–6

Women's doubles

 Judy Tegart /  Lesley Turner defeated  Lorraine Robinson /  Évelyne Terras, 6–0, 6–2

Mixed doubles

 Owen Davidson /  Lesley Turner defeated   Tony Roche /  Judy Tegart, 9–7, 6–4

External links
 Australian Open official website

References

 
1967 in Australian tennis
1967
January 1967 sports events in Australia
1967,Australian Championships